Hale was an electoral ward of Trafford covering the villages of Hale and Hale Barns.

The ward was abolished in 2004, and its area split between the new Hale Central and Hale Barns wards.

Its electoral history since 1973 is as follows:

References

External links
Trafford Council

Wards of Trafford
1974 establishments in England